Mieroszyno  is a village in the administrative district of Gmina Puck, within Puck County, Pomeranian Voivodeship, in northern Poland. It is located within the ethnocultural region of Kashubia in the historic region of Pomerania.

The village has a population of 601.

History
Mieroszyno was a royal village of the Polish Crown, administratively located in the Puck County in the Pomeranian Voivodeship.

During the German occupation of Poland (World War II), in 1942, several Polish families were expelled by the Germans, and enslaved as forced labour in the county.

References

Mieroszyno